Tomaž Žemva (born 18 August 1973) is a Slovenian biathlete. He competed in the men's 20 km individual event at the 1998 Winter Olympics.

References

1973 births
Living people
Slovenian male biathletes
Olympic biathletes of Slovenia
Biathletes at the 1998 Winter Olympics
People from Upper Carniola
20th-century Slovenian people